The voiced uvular tap or flap is a type of consonantal sound, used in some spoken languages.
There is no dedicated symbol for this sound in the IPA. It can specified by adding a 'short' diacritic to the letter for the uvular plosive, but normally it is covered by the unmodified letter for the uvular trill, since the two have never been reported to contrast.

The uvular tap or flap is not known to exist as a phoneme in any language.

More commonly, it is said to vary with the much more frequent uvular trill, and is most likely a single-contact trill  rather than an actual tap or flap  in these languages.

Features
Features of the voiced uvular tap or flap:

Occurrence

Notes

References

 
 
 

 
 
 
 
 

Uvular consonants
Tap and flap consonants
Pulmonic consonants
Oral consonants
Central consonants